The IEC Convention Center of Cebu or the IC3 Convention Center (formerly the International Eucharistic Congress Pavilion) is a convention center within the grounds of the 23 Minore Park development along Pope John Paul II Avenue in Barangay Luz, Cebu City, Philippines. The convention center was built in order to host the 2016 International Eucharistic Congress held in the city.

The facility is owned by the Archdiocese of Cebu and is managed by Regent Property International.

History

Background and prior plans
With Cebu City due to host the International Eucharistic Congress (IEC) in 2016, the Archdiocese of Cebu sought a venue for the congress.

It was planned that a venue would be built out of the unfinished shell of a privately owned commercial building behind ParkMall in Mandaue which is also near to the Cebu International Convention Center. However, such plans were scrapped in favor of building a venue within the seminary compound of the Archdiocese so that the facility, which will be used for other events of the local church after the IEC, will be more accessible to the archdiocese's constituents.

Construction
The groundbreaking for the IEC Pavilion was done on February 15, 2014, which was attended by Archdiocese of Cebu officials as well as local government officials. Construction commenced in July 2014 and the building was topped off on July 15, 2015.

The secretariat building is 95 percent complete while the plenary hall is 69 percent done by July 2015. Overall the facility is 82.8 percent done with September 2015 as the target month of completion by this time.

By November 2015, the structure was 97 percent complete with structural and architectural aspects already complete and only finishing works to be done.

Turnover
Duros Development Corporation, the contractors of the IEC Pavilion, turned over the facility to the Archdiocese of Cebu on November 21, 2015. The following day, on November 22, 2015, which also happens to be the Feast of Christ the King, the IEC Pavilion was opened to the public. The facility was consecrated to Christ the King in a ceremony attended by 7,000 people.

Turnover and inauguration
In October 2016, Regent Property International a firm linked to Duros Construction Inc. formally took over the management of the venue.

The former IEC Pavilion was redeveloped into a full-fledged convention center. On December 15, 2016, Duros Land inaugurated the venue as the "IEC Convention Center of Cebu" or the "IC3 Convention Center" The St. John XXII Minore Seminary where the convention center stood was made into a development by Duros Land known as the 23 Minore Park. The redevelopment of the seminary which was completed by December 2016 into the 23 Minore Park took about six months.

The Archdiocese of Cebu the owners of the property has allowed Duros Land on handling the venue's operation for the next 25 years.

Events
The IC3 Convention Center was built as the IEC Pavilion, meant as the primary venue of the 2016 International Eucharistic Congress.

After the congress, the center has hosted many religious activities organized mainly by its owner, the Archdiocese of Cebu. On May 18, 2017, ALA Boxing Promotions announced that the center will host Pinoy Pride 41, a boxing event headlined by Thai boxer Komgrich Nantapech and Donnie Nietes.

Other use
During the COVID-19 pandemic a 130-bed capacity quarantine facility for mild and moderate COVID-19 patients was set up in the convention center.

Architecture and design

The IC3 Convention Center was constructed by property developer, Duros Development Corporation which also financed the project for usufructuary rights for 25 years over the facility. Among the people involved in the construction of the project is architect Carlos Pio Zafra and project-in-charge Engineer Adonis Gabutin. Rizal Camangyan Jr. is also reported to be involved as a construction manager.

During the groundbreaking ceremony of the IC3 Convention Center as the IEC Pavilion, IEC secretary Msgr. Dennis Villarojo explains that the structure is dubbed as a "Pavilion" because the venue would not be convention center with high-end amenities. He described the would-be structure as "simple" and would provide delegates of the congress in 2016 "a comfortable and decent venue". He insists that the IEC Pavilion would not be a high-end facility describing the then to be built venue as "a roofed structure with walls, floors and will be air-conditioned,

Zafra, the architect of the IEC Pavilion said he was instructed that the design of the building is to be "simple". Camangyan noted that Cebu Auxiliary Bishop Dennis Villarojo called for "low maintenance building" specifying that there would be no finishes to be done on the floor so that it can be cleaned using a mop. Likewise the walls and ceiling were bare and unadorned. The facility was also to be designed to be earthquake-resistant withstanding strong earthquakes such as the magnitude 7.2 Bohol-Cebu earthquake of 2013.

Facilities
As the IEC Pavilion, the venue had a plenary hall, a secretariat building, a chapel, a media center, and holding rooms for bishops and priests. The pavilion had three levels

As the IC3 Convention Center, the venue has 10,000 seating capacity. The IC3 has three convention halls and a function room. Hall A has a capacity of 3,000 people, Hall B can accommodate 5,000 people, and Hall C can seat 2,000 people.

The second level of the convention center which can be used for wedding events and medium-scale conferences can seat about 500 people. The facility also hosts a holding room for performers and breakout rooms for small-scale gatherings. The grand hallway of the convention center is dubbed as the Ganghaan Walk where photos of the 2016 International Eucharistic Congress are exhibited.

For the facility's parking space, there are 255 slots available.

References

Buildings and structures in Cebu City
Event venues established in 2015
Convention centers in the Philippines